The 2004–05 Iowa State Cyclones men's basketball team represents Iowa State University during the 2004–05 NCAA Division I men's basketball season. The Cyclones were coached by Wayne Morgan, who was in his 2nd season. They played their home games at Hilton Coliseum in Ames, Iowa, and competed in the Big 12 Conference.

Previous season

The Cyclones finished 20–13, 7–9 in Big 12 play to finish 8th the regular season conference standings.  They lost to Oklahoma State in the quarterfinals of the Big 12 tournament.  They received an at-large bid to the NIT tournament where they defeated Georgia, Florida State, Marquette and lost to Rutgers in the Final Four.

Incoming players

Roster

Schedule and results

|-
!colspan=12 style=""|Exhibition

|-

|-
!colspan=12 style=""|Regular Season

|-

|-

|-

|-

|-

|-

|-

|-

|-

|-
|-

|-

|-

|-

|-

|-

|-

|-

|-

|-

|-

|-

|-

|-

|-

|-

|-
!colspan=12 style=""|Big 12 Tournament
|-

|-

|-
!colspan=12 style=""|NCAA Tournament
|-

|-

|-

Awards and honors

All-American

Curtis Stinson (Honorable Mention)

All-Conference Selections

Curtis Stinson (2nd Team)
Jared Homan (3rd Team)

Ralph A. Olsen Award

Jared Homan (2004)
Curtis Stinson(2004)

References

Iowa State Cyclones men's basketball seasons
Iowa State
Iowa State
Iowa State Cyc
Iowa State Cyc